The shield-faced roundleaf bat (Hipposideros lylei) is a species of bat in the family Hipposideridae. It is found in China, Laos, Malaysia, Myanmar, Thailand and Vietnam.

References

Hipposideros
Mammals described in 1913
Bats of Asia
Taxa named by Oldfield Thomas
Taxonomy articles created by Polbot